The Bevilacqua-Lazise Altarpiece is a 1548 oil-on-canvas painting by Paolo Veronese, now in Castelvecchio Museum in Verona. It was commissioned by the Bevilaqua-Lazise family for their funerary chapel in the church of San Fermo Maggiore in Verona. Two of the family are shown praying in the bottom corners, with John the Baptist and a bishop saint. The altarpiece is an early work by Veronese, painted when his style still bore the strong imprint of his teacher Antonio Badile.

References

Paintings by Paolo Veronese
Paintings in the collection of the Castelvecchio Museum
Paintings of the Madonna and Child
Angels in art
Paintings depicting John the Baptist
1548 paintings
Altarpieces
Books in art